Tetrahydrodeoxycorticosterone (abbreviated as THDOC; 3α,21-dihydroxy-5α-pregnan-20-one), also referred to as allotetrahydrocorticosterone, is an endogenous neurosteroid. It is synthesized from the adrenal hormone deoxycorticosterone by the action of two enzymes, 5α-reductase type I and 3α-hydroxysteroid dehydrogenase. THDOC is a potent positive allosteric modulator of the GABAA receptor, and has sedative, anxiolytic and anticonvulsant effects. Changes in the normal levels of this steroid particularly during pregnancy and menstruation may be involved in some types of epilepsy (catamenial epilepsy) and premenstrual syndrome, as well as stress, anxiety and depression.

Chemistry

See also 
 Allopregnanolone
 Dihydrodeoxycorticosterone (DHDOC)
 Tetrahydrocorticosterone (THB)

References 

Neurosteroids
Anticonvulsants
Hypnotics
GABAA receptor positive allosteric modulators
GABAA-rho receptor negative allosteric modulators
Pregnanes